The Vachagan is a river in the southern Syunik Province of Armenia. The river has a length of 5 km and flows through the town of Kapan. It is a tributary of the Voghji (Oxçu). Its origin is at the northern edge of Mount Khustup in the Syunik Mountains range. It has a basin of 35 km2.

See also
List of lakes of Armenia
Geography of Armenia

References

Rivers of Armenia